Sophie Román Haug (born 4 June 1999) is a Norwegian professional footballer who plays as a forward for Italian Serie A club AS Roma and the Norway national team.

Club career 
After playing for Kløfta Idrettslag, she went to LSK Kvinner in 2015. She was heavily involved in her team winning both the cup and the league in 2018, with 14 league goals. She became LSK's top scorer in 2020 with eight goals. In 2021, she was named to the team of the year in the Toppserien by NTB, after nine goals in 15 league games.

In January 2022 she signed for Roma, becoming the most expensive sale from LSK Kvinner ever.

International career 
Haug had an extensive career for Norwegian youth national teams. She has international matches for U15, U16, U17, U19, U23, and the senior Norwegian national team. 

She scored a goal during the 2018 UEFA Under-19 European Championship.

Haug was selected for the senior Norwegian national team for the first time in 2018.  In 2022, she was selected for the national team's squad for the 2022 UEFA European Championships. Her debut came in June.

She scored her first three senior national team goals in the World Cup qualifier at home against Albania, on 6 September 2022.

International goals

Honours

Club

References

1999 births
Living people
People from Ullensaker
Norwegian women's footballers
Norway women's youth international footballers
Women's association football forwards
Toppserien players
LSK Kvinner FK players
Serie A (women's football) players
A.S. Roma (women) players
Norwegian expatriate women's footballers
Expatriate women's footballers in Italy
Norwegian expatriate sportspeople in Italy
Sportspeople from Viken (county)
UEFA Women's Euro 2022 players

Association football forwards
Norway international footballers